Warren Berlinger (August 31, 1937 – December 2, 2020) was an American character actor, with Broadway runs, movie and television credits, and much work in commercials.

Early life
Warren Berlinger was born in Brooklyn, New York City, New York, of Jewish heritage, the son of Frieda (née Shapkin) and Elias Berlinger, a building contractor. His family owned Berlinger's Glass Store on Avenue D.

Career
Berlinger performed in the original 1946 Broadway production of Annie Get Your Gun, with Ethel Merman and Ray Middleton. He guest-starred on the original Howdy Doody television show, with roles following on Kraft Television Theatre and other programs. He also guest-starred on John Cassavetes's detective series, NBC's Johnny Staccato. He was known to have co-starred with Elvis.

In 1960, he appeared with Jack Lemmon and Rick Nelson in The Wackiest Ship in the Army as Radioman 2nd class A.J. Sparks.

Berlinger appeared in both the Broadway stage and Hollywood movie productions of Blue Denim (winning a Theatre World Award for the stage version), and also The Happy Time, Anniversary Waltz (later adapted as the movie Happy Anniversary), and Come Blow Your Horn in 1961. He also performed in the 1963 London stage production of How to Succeed in Business Without Really Trying at the Shaftesbury Theatre. His career as a character actor began in 1956 with the film Teenage Rebel, and continued in the movies Because They're Young (1960), The Wackiest Ship In The Army (1960), Billie (1965) and Thunder Alley (1967).

In 1965, Berlinger was the star of Kilroy, a segment of Walt Disney's Wonderful World of Color. In 1966, he played Phillip Short in the movie Spinout. Later appearances included episodes of Charlie's Angels, Happy Days (including an appearance as "tough-as-nails" United States Army recruiter Sergeant Betchler), on Marlo Thomas' TV show That Girl, as Thomas's stingy cousin Howard (Season 1, Episode 27) and as Dr. Goldfisher (Season 4, Episode 25), Love, American Style, Operation Petticoat, Friends, Columbo and Murder, She Wrote. In 1973, he was a regular cast member of the short-lived situation comedy A Touch of Grace. He also starred in an Archie Bunker-type sitcom entitled "Warren." In 1975, he was a special guest member of the show Emergency! playing the role of heart transplant patient Frank Fenady alongside Jeanne Cooper.

His other films include The Long Goodbye (1973), The Girl Most Likely to... (1973), Lepke (1975), I Will, I Will... for Now (1976), The Shaggy D.A. (1976), The Magician of Lublin (1979), The Cannonball Run (1981), The World According to Garp (1982), Ten Little Indians (1989), Hero (1992) and That Thing You Do! (1996).

In 2006, Berlinger marked his 60th anniversary in show business. He was both honorary mayor and honorary sheriff of Chatsworth, California.

His final acting credit was a 2016 episode of Grace and Frankie.

Personal life
In 1960, Berlinger married actress Betty Lou Keim, who died in 2010. They had four children.

Berlinger died from cancer on December 2, 2020, at the Henry Mayo Newhall Memorial Hospital in Valencia, California; he was 83.

Filmography

References

External links

1937 births
2020 deaths
Male actors from New York City
American male film actors
American male musical theatre actors
American male television actors
Jewish American male actors
Musicians from Brooklyn
20th-century American male actors
21st-century American male actors
21st-century American Jews
Deaths from cancer in California